Grande Fratello 11 was the eleventh season of the Italian version of the reality show franchise Big Brother. The show premiered on 18 October 2010 and concluded on 18 April 2011. It was the longest regular Grande Fratello season and prime time show in Italy. Alessia Marcuzzi returned as the main host of the show. The house had been radically renewed from the last season. The winner of this season, Andrea Cocco, received a €300,000 grand prize.

Housemates

Nominations table

Week 2 – Week 14

Week 15 – Finale

Controversy

Blasphemy and problems with televoting 
In the night between 17 and 18 December the housemate Matteo Casnici, during a conversation with Davide Baronicini and Francesca Giaccari, accidentally uttered a blasphemous expression: the incident was the subject of much controversy, especially by Catholic viewers, who following the program. For this reason, Grande Fratello has taken measures against the housemate and has decided not to resort to ejection, as happened in similar cases in previous editions, but to punish him with the nomination of office.

Subsequently, former housemate of GF10 Massimo Scattarella, ejected for blasphemy, asked to be reinstated in the house or, alternatively, a measure similar to the one he suffered for Matteo Casnici. Scattarella was a guest in the studio in the episode of December 27, 2010, reminding the authors of the show that all the housemates sign a contract with Endemol that explicitly prohibits swearing or cursing, under penalty of disqualification from the show. Grande Fratello then gave Massimo a second chance, making the public decide whether or not he could become an official competitor of GF11. The man entered the house on December 27, 2010 and waited for the response of the televoting serving a week of permanence inside the "Tugurio" in solitude.

In the end the public voted for the readmission and Massimo entered the house as an official housemate on January 3, 2011. This decision was the subject of much controversy by the Moige, which on January 4, 2011 issued an official press release in which the reality show of Canale 5 was accused of providing viewers with an indecent and deplorable show, in which the limits of public decency have been abundantly exceeded, since in the past the blasphemy on live television had always been heavily condemned and had never been forgiveness or the reintegration of a blasphemer.

The Catholic daily Avvenire also lashed out against the broadcast by publishing an article in which the reality show was accused of making a spectacle of the offense against God and the good education that unites believers and non-believers. Subsequently, on January 8, 2011, due to a deplorable episode that occurred inside the house, the authors unexpectedly canceled the weekly televoting between the three housemates at risk of elimination, namely Giuliano Cimetti, Olivia Lechner and Pietro Titone. Grande Fratello, in an official statement issued by the broadcast site, added that it would fully reimburse all spectators who had voted during the week.

The reasons of this cancellation are due to another blasphemy pronounced on the night between 7 and 8 January 2011 by Pietro Titone. Following this event, there were further controversies and the issue of blasphemies on TV has aroused strong negative reactions from many Italian religious associations; for this reason and for the low level reached by the housemates of this edition, Mediaset, publisher of the reality show, in the episode of January 10, 2011 considered it appropriate to intervene with an official statement in which it ejected all the housemates guilty of having uttered a curse inside of the house, namely Matteo Casnici, Pietro Titone and Massimo Scattarella (who pronounced a blasphemy during Grande Fratello 10). An unprecedented decision in the history of Big Brother.

A few days after the mass expulsion, the national consumer union started a collective action against the televoting of the broadcast. In fact Massimiliano Dona, UNC secretary general, considered it appropriate that viewers who through the televoting system had decided to readmit Massimo Scattarella into the house were reimbursed, believing that none of them would have cast their vote and invested their money, if only they could have imagined that the outcome of the televoting would then have been canceled due to the decision of the publisher Mediaset, which following the succession of controversies that the issue of blasphemies on TV and the very readmission of the competitor had provoked, subsequently ejected all contestants accused of cursing, including Scattarella. On January 17, 2011, Alessia Marcuzzi opened the 14th evening episode by announcing that viewers who had previously voted for Massimo Scattarella's reinstatement would also be fully reimbursed.

Online casting dispute 
Another controversy was generated by the online casting televoting mechanism. For some months, in fact (precisely from 3 September to 15 December 2010), the public was asked to vote by sending a text message, a presentation video uploaded by the aspiring competitors on the official website of the broadcast. The competitor who entered the house would then be chosen by the authors among the fifty most voted videos. However, according to the accusations, the vote of the viewers was useless, since on the broadcast website a ranking of the fifty most voted is drawn up and none of the top fifteen appears to have reached live television, to the detriment of viewers who had voted for over three months, his own favorite. It was also assumed that the winner of the casting, Nathan Lelli, who ranked 25th in the ranking, belonged to a well-known agency in the entertainment world once again to intend by the authors the total disinterest of the public's vote in favor a recommendation from the housemate's agency.

For this reason, the antitrust has also been interested in opening an investigation into the televoting system, which will examine the positions of RTI, Telecom Italia and TXT Polymedia for the next few months in order to establish whether or not there have been violations to the detriment of viewers. In response, on January 14, 2011, Grande Fratello issued a press release on its official website confirming the regular management of online casting televoting and claiming that the competitor chosen to enter the house, Nathan Lelli, had no connection with management, which, moreover, would not have been contrary to the regulation.

When the controversy seemed to have subsided, on January 27, Nathan Lelli pronounced a further blasphemy while organizing a joke against other housemates: the immediate request by the consumer associations for the suspension of the weekly televoting and the expulsion of Lelli (who saw him at risk of elimination together with Biagio D'Anelli and Roberto Manfredini), which took place in the late afternoon of the same 27 January; also in this case, Grande Fratello assured that all viewers participating in the televoting would be reimbursed.

References
  
 World of Big Brother

2010 Italian television seasons
11